Phalaenopsis gigantea is a species of orchid endemic to the island of Borneo and was first described in 1909. The specific epithet gigantea refers to the giant size of its leaves, which can grown over 60 cm in length on a mature plant. It is the largest known Phalaenopsis species.

Species description

A very short monopodial stem with 5-6 large silvery-green pendent leaves that can measure over 60 cm in length
 flowers are ~5 cm across (up to 6.5 cm), cream background with raised red-brown spots, and varying degrees of green around the column, waxy
Mature, specimen-size plants are capable of producing hundreds of flowers on pendent, branching inflorescences reaching 40 centimeters
blooms have sweetly fragrant citrus scent
flowers can last many months
inflorescence can rebloom over many seasons 
Although widespread belief that this orchid takes anywhere from 8 to 12 years for a seedling to reach flowering size, it may be possible to flower seedlings in 4 years with ideal culture

Taxonomy
This species is a member of the species complex involving Phalaenopsis kapuasensis, Phalaenopsis rundumensis and Phalaenopsis doweryensis.

Species variants

Phal. gigantea var aurea: has a brighter yellow background color throughout the sepals and petals

Growing conditions
warm to hot growing orchid
although not difficult to grow, (gigantea) seedlings take significantly longer to reach maturity than other species 
particularly susceptible to rot if water gets trapped between the leaves
allow potting media to dry out completely between watering
Phal. gigantea needs its entire root system to keep the large leaves hydrated, so as a result is very sensitive to getting its roots disrupted
prefers higher light than most phalaenopsis

Use in horticulture
This plant has been used in the creation of Phalaenopsis hybrids, as its huge size and pendent inflorescences are recessive traits in crosses with complex tetraploid hybrids. Two colour morphs are significant to horticulture: paler brown patterns without red colouration against a yellow ground colour and secondly brown-red patterns against a yellow ground colour. As of February 2022, the International Orchid Register of the Royal Horticultural Society lists 321 registered hybrids involving this species.

References

External links
 
 

gigantea
Endemic flora of Borneo
Orchids of Borneo